Il paradiso delle signore is an Italian period drama television series on RAI Italian television, loosely based on the 1883 novel Au bonheur des dames by Emile Zola. The series focuses on the lives of the owner and workers of a department store based in Milan.

Cast and characters 

 Giuseppe Zeno: Pietro Mori
 Giusy Buscemi: Teresa Iorio
 Alessandro Tersigni: Vittorio Conti
 Christiane Filangieri: Clara Mantovani
 Lorena Cacciatore: Lucia Gritti
 Giulia Vecchio: Anna Imbriani
 Silvia Mazzieri: Silvana Maffeis
 Corrado Tedeschi: Carlo Mandelli
 Alice Torriani: Andreina Mandelli
 Helene Nardini: Marina Mandelli
 Andrea Pennacchi: Ezio Galli
 Riccardo Leonelli: Federico Cazzaniga
 Alessandro Averone: Bruno Jacobi
 Filippo Scarafia: Roberto Landi
 Claudia Vismara: Elsa Tadini
 Marco Bonini: Corrado Colombo
 Cristiano Caccamo: Quinto Reggiani
 Margherita Laterza: Monica Giuliani
 Valeria Fabrizi: contessa
 Antonio Milo: Giuseppe Iorio
 Alessia Giuliani: Francesca Iorio
 Fabrizio Ferracane: Vincenzo Iorio
 Andrea Arcangeli: Mario Iorio
 Giorgio Capitani: monsignor Razzi
 Francesca Valtorta: Valeria Craveri
 Paolo Bovani: Massimo
 Guenda Goria: Violetta
Roberto Farnesi: Umberto Guarnieri
Vanessa Gravina: Adelaide di Sant'Erasmo
Gloria Radulescu: Marta Guarnieri
Enrico Oetiker: Riccardo Guarnieri
Francesco Maccarinelli: Luca Spinelli/Daniele Fonseca
Giorgio Lupano: Luciano Cattaneo
Marta Richeldi: Silvia Cattaneo
Federica Girardello: Nicoletta Cattaneo
Alessandro Fella: Federico Cattaneo
Enrica Pintore: Clelia Calligaris/Clelia Bacchini
Antonella Attili: Agnese Amato
Giulio Maria Corso: Antonio Amato
Neva Leoni: Concetta “Tina” Amato
Emanuel Caserio: Salvatore “Salvo” Amato
Giulia Petrungaro: Elena Montemurro
Federica De Benedittis: Roberta Pellegrino
Ilaria Rossi: Gabriella Rossi
Francesca Del Fa: Irene Cipriani
Giulia Arena: Ludovica Brancia Di Montalto
Sara Ricci: Anita Marini
Desirée Noferini: Lisa Conterno/Ada Manetti
Luca Capuano: Sandro Recalcati
Michele Cesari: Cesare Diamante
Jgor Barbazza: Oscar Bacchini
Gaia Messerklinger: Nora Vitali, in arte Lydia Stanton
Gianluca Ferrato: Bernardo

Episodes

External links

References 

RAI original programming
2015 Italian television series debuts
2010s Italian drama television series
2020s Italian drama television series
Television shows set in Milan